The Molala (also Molale, Molalla, Molele) are a people of the Plateau culture area in the Oregon Cascades and central Oregon, United States. They are one of the Confederated Tribes of the Grand Ronde Community of Oregon, with 141 of the 882 members in the 1950s claiming Molala descent. The Confederated Tribes of Siletz Indians also has Molalla representation among its confederation of Tribes and Bands. The Siletz Reservation was established in 1855, for the Coast, Willamette and Umpqua Tribes (Rogue River and Shasta Tribes soon after added). The Molalla are one of the Tribes who signed the 1855 Willamette Valley Treaty (aka Kalapuya, etc. Treaty).

Language
The Molala language was a member of the Plateau Penutian family. It was previously considered a language isolate. Molala is now extinct.

History

The ancestral lands of the Molala people were located south of the Columbia River where various areas were occupied for seasonal resource exploitation. During the winter, members of the nation resided in the vicinity of modern Tygh Valley. During the spring, the Molalas moved to a site along the Deschutes River near what is now Antelope. There, they gathered stockpiles of fish, particularly Sockeye salmon and Columbia River redband trout. Throughout the summer and autumn, the Molalas gathered outside modern Wapinitia where they dug for the tubers of camas and wapato and collected regional berries.

The Molala traditionally occupied the western slopes of the Cascade Mountain range. After they relocated to portions of the Willamette Valley, the Molala had to contend with groups of Cayuse warriors who occasionally attacked their settlements for slaves. During the last known Cayuse raid, likely in the late 1820s, a Molala nobleman was killed. A Clackamas man was used as an intermediary between local Molala soldiers and the Cayuse raiders. He arranged for a second battle. The battle was likely held at Minto Pass, lasted two days, and the Molalas considered it a victory.

In 1848, Molala war chief Loshuk (Crooked Finger) led 150 warriors (Molala, Klamath, Umpqua, Rogue, Atsugewi, Achomawi, Modoc) in an attempt to attack white men who were in the Willamette Valley, but their plan failed after the warriors were ambushed near Butte Creek and their village on the Abiqua Creek shore was attacked. Crooked Finger and his warriors took part in the Cayuse War as allies of their kinsmen.

Footnotes

Further reading
 John B. Horner, "Oregon: Her History, Her Great Men, Her Literature." Portland, OR:  J.K. Gill Co., 1919.
 Marianne Mithun,The Languages of Native North America. Cambridge England: Cambridge University Press, 1999.
 Nicholas J. Pharris, Nicholas J., Winuunsi Tm Talapaas: A Grammar of the Molalla Language.  Ph.D. dissertation, University of Michigan, 2006.

External links
 One on the Molalals
 A second link on the Molalas
 The third link on the Molalas
 On the Molala language, plus Molalla Culture and History Links
 Some genealogy of the Molalas
 A google book

Native American tribes in Oregon
Indigenous peoples of the Northwest Plateau
Willamette Valley
Confederated Tribes of Siletz Indians